James Blake and Sam Querrey were the defending champions, but lost in the first round to Philipp Marx and Florin Mergea.
Jamie Murray and John Peers won the title, defeating Bob Bryan and Mike Bryan in the final, 1–6, 7–6(7–3), [12–10].

Seeds

Draw

Draw

References
 Main draw

Doubles